Aphrodite of the Gardens is an epithet of the Greek goddess Aphrodite. The epithet describes her patronage over vegetation and garden fertility.

According to Pausanias, there was a sanctuary of Aphrodite of the Gardens near the Acropolis of Athens, accessible through an underground passage. It was said to have held a cult statue of Aphrodite by Alcamenes and a herm of Aphrodite near the temple. It is unsure whether the statue of Aphrodite and the herm of Aphrodite were the same sculpture or two separate sculptures.

The herm of Aphrodite may be linked to the later mythological character, Hermaphroditos. There are numerous references to a male aspect of Aphrodite, called Aphroditos, which was imported to Athens from Cyprus in the late 5th century BC and also a temple of Hermaphroditos was spoken of by Alciphron at Athens.

See also
 Aphrodite Urania
 Aphrodite of Knidos

Notes

References

External links
 Ancient texts pertaining to Aphrodite of the Gardens

Epithets of Aphrodite